Authe is a commune in the Ardennes department in the Grand Est region of northern France.

The inhabitants of the commune are known as Authois or Authoises.

Geography
Authe is located some 45 km east by south-east of Rethel and 20 km north-east of Vouziers. Access to the commune is by road D12 from Brieulles-sur-Bar in the north which passes through the centre of the commune and the village and continues south to join the D947 south of the commune. The commune consists entirely of farmland.

The Bar river forms the south-western border of the commune as it flows north-west to follow the Canal des Ardennes to join the Meuse near Vrigne-Meuse. The Ruisseau de Saint-Pierremont flows from the north-east of the commune past the village and joins the Bar on the south-western border of the commune.

Neighbouring communes and villages

Heraldry

Administration

List of Successive Mayors

Demography
In 2017 the commune had 90 inhabitants.

Culture and heritage

Religious heritage
The commune has one religious building registered as an historical monument:
The Church of Saint-Martin (14th century)

See also
Communes of the Ardennes department

References

External links
Authe on Géoportail, National Geographic Institute (IGN) website 
Authe on the 1750 Cassini Map

Communes of Ardennes (department)